West Modesto is a census-designated place (CDP) in Stanislaus County, California, United States. The population was 5,682 at the 2010 census, down from 6,096 at the 2000 census. It is part of the Modesto Metropolitan Statistical Area.

Geography
West Modesto is located at  (37.622281, -121.028784).

Climate
According to the Köppen Climate Classification system, West Modesto has a warm-summer Mediterranean climate, abbreviated "Csa" on climate maps.

Demographics

2010
The 2010 United States Census reported that West Modesto had a population of 5,682. The racial makeup of West Modesto was 3,020 (53.2%) White, 136 (2.4%) African American, 84 (1.5%) Native American, 263 (4.6%) Asian, 8 (0.1%) Pacific Islander, 1,885 (33.2%) from other races, and 286 (5.0%) from two or more races. Hispanic or Latino of any race were 3,526 persons (62.1%).

The Census reported that 5,651 people (99.5% of the population) lived in households, 31 (0.5%) lived in non-institutionalized group quarters, and 0 (0%) were institutionalized.

There were 1,593 households, out of which 789 (49.5%) had children under the age of 18 living in them, 757 (47.5%) were opposite-sex married couples living together, 310 (19.5%) had a female householder with no husband present, 166 (10.4%) had a male householder with no wife present.  There were 167 (10.5%) unmarried opposite-sex partnerships, and 11 (0.7%) same-sex married couples or partnerships. 255 households (16.0%) were made up of individuals, and 104 (6.5%) had someone living alone who was 65 years of age or older. The average household size was 3.55.  There were 1,233 families (77.4% of all households); the average family size was 3.93.

The population was spread out, with 1,755 people (30.9%) under the age of 18, 646 people (11.4%) aged 18 to 24, 1,545 people (27.2%) aged 25 to 44, 1,275 people (22.4%) aged 45 to 64, and 461 people (8.1%) who were 65 years of age or older.  The median age was 30.2 years. For every 100 females, there were 103.4 males.  For every 100 females age 18 and over, there were 101.5 males.

The homeowner vacancy rate was 3.5%; the rental vacancy rate was 7.0%.  2,682 people (47.2% of the population) lived in owner-occupied housing units and 2,969 people (52.3%) lived in rental housing units.

2000
As of the census of 2000, there were 6,096 people, 1,728 households, and 1,354 families residing in the CDP. The racial makeup of the CDP was 55.27% White, 3.33% African American, 2.53% Native American, 3.07% Asian, 0.36% Pacific Islander, 30.73% from other races, and 4.72% from two or more races. Hispanic or Latino of any race were 51.28% of the population.

There were 1,728 households, out of which 43.0% had children under the age of 18 living with them, 49.7% were married couples living together, 19.0% had a female householder with no husband present, and 21.6% were non-families. 16.6% of all households were made up of individuals, and 6.6% had someone living alone who was 65 years of age or older.  The average household size was 3.51 and the average family size was 3.87.

In the CDP, the population was spread out, with 34.2% under the age of 18, 11.2% from 18 to 24, 28.5% from 25 to 44, 16.7% from 45 to 64, and 9.4% who were 65 years of age or older.  The median age was 28 years. For every 100 females, there were 104.1 males.  For every 100 females age 18 and over, there were 103.9 males.

The median income for a household in the CDP was $30,132, and the median income for a family was $30,848. Males had a median income of $27,286 versus $19,583 for females. The per capita income for the CDP was $10,850.  About 23.7% of families and 28.0% of the population were below the poverty line, including 39.0% of those under age 18 and 10.3% of those age 65 or over.

Government

References

Census-designated places in Stanislaus County, California
Census-designated places in California